Camillina elegans is a spider species in the genus Camillina. It is found in the Caribbean, in Angola and in the Pacific Islands.

See also
 List of Gnaphosidae species

References

External links

Gnaphosidae
Fauna of Angola
Spiders of the Caribbean
Spiders of Africa
Spiders of Oceania
Spiders described in 1940